The 1924 Southern Branch Grizzlies football team was an American football team that represented the Southern Branch of the University of California (later known as UCLA) during the 1924 college football season.  The program, which was later known as the Bruins, was in their second year under head coach James J. Cline. The Grizzlies compiled a 0–5–3 record and were outscored by their opponents by a combined total of 109 to 40.

Schedule

References

Southern Branch
UCLA Bruins football seasons
College football winless seasons
Southern Branch Grizzlies football